Dimasaua, also spelled Dimasawa and Dimasava, was the invented name created by 17th-century Spanish missionary Fr. Francisco Colín, S.J., pointing to a tiny isle in southern Leyte whose chief, according to Colín, "gave the most signal service" to Ferdinand Magellan and his crew at the port of Butuan in March–April 1521.

The incident is described in a three-paragraph epitome of Magellan's sojourn in Philippine waters, part of a historical study entitled Labor evangelica obreros de la compañia de Jesus en las islas Filipinas, which was published 1663 in Madrid.

Principal source of Magellan story

Colín identified his principal source for his reconstruction of the above episode as Antonio Pigafetta as edited by Giovanni Battista Ramusio. Ramusio was the foremost travel writer of the Renaissance who retranslated back to Italian a French text of Antonio Pigafetta's account of Magellan's voyage. The French text, known today as Colines edition in honor of its printer, was done supposedly by Jacopo Fabri who worked on the French translation based on an original Italian text which is now considered lost.

Ramusio's work is entitled Viaggio attorno il mondo scritto per M. Antonio Pigafetta...tradotto di lingua francese nella Italiana and is found in a compendium of travel stories, Primo Volume delle Navigationi et Viaggi...Venetia, gli heredi di Luc Antonio Giunti, 1563. This same translation came out earlier in 1536, anonymously, in book form entitled Il viaggio fatto da gli Spagniuoli a torno a'l mondo without the name of the printer and place of publication. Scholars have speculated it was printed by N. Zopini at Venice. The same work, Delle navigationi...was first republished in 1550 without any credit as to authorship. It was preceded by Ramusio's "Discorso" where he remarks the French text was done by Fabri, which has never been corroborated by any external evidence. Vol. I was republished in 1554 again without any author's name for the Pigafetta translation. Ramusio's name as the author of the translation came out only in the edition of 1563.

Ramusio corruption of Pigafetta's account

The Ramusio translation is a hopelessly garbled story of the above incident. In the authentic account of Pigafetta, the port was not Butuan, which was and is not an island, but an island named Mazaua, pronounced "masawa", a word found only in Butuanon and a derivative language, Tausog, and in no other of over 200 Philippine languages and dialects. 

In Ramusio's corrupted story Magellan and his crew celebrated a mass at Butuan on Easter Sunday, March 31, 1521. They also planted a big cross atop the tallest hill in the afternoon of the same day. From Butuan, so Ramusio's story goes, they sailed for Cebu passing "Zeilon, Bohol, Messana..." Tantalizingly, Ramusio then talks of the fleet being at "Messana" which was the name given by Maximilianus Transylvanus in 1522 to Mazaua. "Messana" because of its familiarity to Europeans—it's the name of the Italian port where the bubonic plague started—had for a long time supplanted the true name, Mazaua, so that even as late as 1894 when the Italian scholar Andrea da Mosto had expertly transcribed Pigafetta's Ambrosiana codex, which work fully established the text of that manuscript that has essentially been adopted by succeeding historiographers, even then da Mosto used Transylvanus' "Mazana." 

The confused timeline of Ramusio's story has Magellan's fleet anchored from March 28-April 4, 1521 at Butuan. Then from Butuan, they sailed for Cebu but all of a sudden are found at "Messana" which in the real story is "Mazaua" where the fleet did in fact anchor on those dates. But, as Ramusio wrongly relates, the real port, Mazaua, is supplanted by Butuan, and Gatighan, the waystation, supplanted by "Messana." It's important to remember this mix-up to have a clear view of which island in the true story Colín's Dimasaua is pointing to.

The precise story, as told by Antonio Pigafetta and the other witnesses, is the fleet had anchored at a tiny — about 3,930 hectares according to Ginés de Mafra - island-port named Mazaua which The Genoese Pilot said was at latitude 9° north, locating the skerry in Mindanao. From Mazaua the Armada sailed for Cebu in the Visayas in central Philippines passing first at a little island called Gatighan. By tracing this route, we are able to determine that Colín's Dimasaua is actually Pigafetta's "Gatighan."

Secondary source, Antonio de Herrera y Tordesillas

Colín's other source was Antonio de Herrera y Tordesillas whose story of the above incident was taken from the papers of Andrés de San Martín, the chief pilot-astrologer (cosmographer) of Magellan's fleet. These papers were confiscated from Gines de Mafra who had possession of these  papers which were entrusted by San Martín in Cebu way back in April or May 1521. Herrera's version is a faithful account of the incident at Mazaua. He talks of the fleet's anchoring at the isle whose name he spells "Mazagua" which is phonetically the exact equivalent of the Butuanon word "masawa." Herrera's "gu" is a Hispanicized rendition of w which is absent in the Spanish alphabet. His account also refers to a cross being planted atop the tallest hill which Magellan, his men and the chiefs or kings of Mazagua and Butuan participated in. 

The version of Herrera was the true account of the incident. His name for the port, Mazagua, was the only correct one ever published from its occurrence in 1521 until 1890 when the same name, spelled differently as "Mazzava", came out in the biography of Magellan written by the English geographer Dr. Francis H.H. Guillemard.

Colín invents "Dimasaua" to linguistically resolve conflict between Ramusio and Herrera

The friar's dilemma was which version to adopt, Ramusio's or Herrera's. Thinking Ramusio's was the authentic Pigafetta account—an eyewitness testimony that therefore supersedes in importance Herrera's second-hand account—Colín wrote that Butuan was the port where the Easter mass was held. Having settled that issue, he proceeded to deal with Herrera's rendition of the Mazaua episode. Since he had already established that an Easter Sunday mass was held at Butuan, he could not very well use Ramusio's "Messana"--the second stop of the fleet in Ramusio's story—because the name's religious connotation—missa is Spanish for mass, and "na" is Bisaya for already—creates an inconsistency in Colín's story. 

Colín thus came up with his invention, "Dimasaua." The word consists of the Bisaya prefix "di" which means not and Herrera's name for the port where an Easter mass was held, "Mazagua." His "Dimasaua" means to say "this is not Herrera's site of the first mass, Mazagua (pronounced "masawa") which I have already located at Butuan." His three-paragraph story on "Dimasaua" has been translated into English by Miguel A. Bernad, S.J., digitized and published on the web at This has been digitized, partly, and published on the Web and the translation of Colin's "Dimasaua" is at https://books.google.com/books?id=NbG7kHtBma8C&pg=PA1&dq=Limasawa&ei=7K9MSY-IGY3WlQTLpKzWBA#PPA3,M1.

Colín's "Dimasaua" becomes "Limasaua"

Five years later after Colín's book had been published, another Spanish missionary Fr. Francisco Combés, S.J., revisited the Mazaua incident in his book on evangelization of Mindanao, Historia de las islas de Mindanao. Progresos de la religion: Madrid, 1667. His sources were the same, Ramusio and Herrera, plus Colín. 

Combés had a different version of Ramusio, one that did not refer to a mass being held at Butuan on March 31, 1521 although a cross being planted at a hill is mentioned. This edition of Ramusio is represented by the English translation of Samuel Purchas, Hakluytus Posthumus or Purchas His Pilgimes, Containing a History of the World in Sea Voyages and Lande Travells by Englishmen and others By Samuel Purchas, B.D., Volume II. Glasgow,1625.

Combés, unlike modern historians who explain clearly their operation, i.e., how they manipulate their sources to arrive at a certain point or conclusion, is opaque in his method and in fact does not even fully account for his sources. But evidence—we know what were available to him—and logic, how he handled his sources, give us a clear idea of his operation.

So, Combés essentially follows Colín's solution to the dilemma posed by the conflicting versions of Ramusio and Herrera. He however does not adopt Colín's name for the waystation, Pigafetta's Gatighan. Since his version of Ramusio does not mention an Easter mass, he did not have to negate the idea of a mass being held elsewhere than in Butuan. He comes up with a different prefix, a syllable, that is unheard of in any Philippine language, and is not of French, Spanish, Italian or Portuguese provenience. "Li" has no significance in the context of Magellan's travel or any linguistic tradition in the Philippines. There is such a word in Confucian or Chinese literature, but as this relates to the circumnavigation story, it is totally foreign.

In any case, Combés invents the name "Limasawa" by which the tiny southern Leyte isle is known today. Following the route earlier traced, the placename points to Pigafetta's Gatighan which is located by Francisco Albo, the pilot who brought Victoria back to Seville, at 10° north latitude just one nautical mile (1.9 km) above the tip of today's Limasawa. In the map of Pigafetta, and in every other map of the Philippines, it is the isle sandwiched between the islands of Bohol and Panaon. Combés's three-paragraph story of "Limasawa" has been translated into English by Miguel A. Bernad, S.J., which has been digitized and published on the web at https://books.google.com/books?id=NbG7kHtBma8C&pg=PA1&dq=Limasawa&ei=7K9MSY-IGY3WlQTLpKzWBA#PPA4,M1.

How "Dimasaua" got eclipsed by "Limasaua"

In 1734 another Spanish Jesuit missionary, Fr. Pedro Murillo Velarde, made a map of the Philippines where for the first time the name "Limasava" is shown. He had a revised edition later where in the cartouche Murillo relates Magellan's visit to Butuan where an Easter mass was held on March 31, 1521. His "Limasaua" therefore is not in conformity with Combés's story that does not talk of a mass.

In a later book he wrote, Murillo states the Leyte isle's names were "Dimasaua" and "Limasaua." One sees here the intervention of pure whim and wild chance—two unpredictable elements in history—Murillo just happened to pick a name he fancied at the moment of creating a map not knowing the name had an inconsistency with his intention.

This map became a sensation among European cartographers and was shamelessly plagiarized by them except Jacques N. Bellin who had the intellectual honesty to cite Murillo as his authority. Bellin published his version, which corrected the longitudes and latitudes of Murillo who merely followed Ramusio, the same year Murillo's came out in 1734.

In 1798, paleographer-conservator Carlo Amoretti of Ambrosiana library in Milan discovered the lost Italian manuscript of Antonio Pigafetta which was written in Renaissance longhand. He forthwith transcribed it and two years later published his version with his notes and emendations. In two footnotes on pages 66 and 72 Amoretti surmises that the "Messana" in Pigafetta may be the "Limassava" in the map of Bellin. Amoretti and Bellin had not read the books of Combés and Colín nor the revised map of Murillo with the cartouche. He therefore was not aware that the name "Limasaua" was in fact a negation of Herrera's correct account of the Mazaua episode.

Historians merely repeat other historians

The old saying history repeats itself is not as true as the truism historians repeat one another. Western navigation historians and Magellan scholars started a tradition of repeating Amoretti's assertion, e.g., Lord Stanley of Alderley (1874), F.H.H. Guillemard (1890), Jose Toribio Medina (1888), Andrea da Mosto (1894), James Alexander Robertson (1906), J. Denuce (1911), and on down the line including Laurence Bergreen (2003). No one subjected Amoretti's dictum to serious critical analysis. 

Religious chroniclers in the Philippines went along with the spirit of invention started by Colín and Combés and gave the isle other names: Limasaba (Fr. Gaspar de San Agustin,1698); Bimasaua (Fr. Juan Francisco de San Antonio, 1738); Simasaua (F. Redondo, 1886). No one gave an explanation for these names. These were asserted in the nature of an ex cathedra pronouncement.

Only one Western maritime historian, the French Léonce Peillard, bucked Amoretti. In Le premier tour du monde de Magellan: France, 1991, his transcription with notes and editorial treatment of an extant Pigafetta manuscript, Ms f. 5650, Peillard in footnote 118 on page 314 and footnote 154 on page 317 assert Mazaua is in the latitude calculated by The Genoese Pilot at 9° north and that Mazaua was in fact part of Mindanao ("Elle en fait partie, en realite". It [Mazaua] forms part of it [Mindanao]). 
 
In the Philippines itself, historians obscured the issue by failing—either deliberately or unintentionally—to cite Amoretti as authority for the Limasaua=Mazaua notion, and reframing the way they looked at the incident back to its religious context as Colín and Combés viewed it. Whereas it was viewed by Westerners in terms of anchorage, the Philippine scholars framed Mazaua as "site" where the First mass in the Philippines was held. This is still how most Philippine historians view it. 

Up to now, it has not been detected that the two names, "Limasaua" and "Dimasaua" contain in their very core a negation of Herrera's "Mazagua." The two names deny Herrera's story that the mass was  held at the island-port of Mazaua.

The critical role of Herrera's "Mazagua" has not been heretofore analyzed except in the paper of Vicente Calibo de Jesus which he read on October 13, 2007 at the annual conference of The Society for the History of Discoveries held at the U.S. Library of Congress, Washington D.C. John N. Schumacher, S.J. did touch on Herrera in an article, noting that "Herrera is the only historian prior to the time of the 19th century publication of Pigafetta, who correctly puts the first Mass in 'Mazagua' which is simply a Hispanicization of Pigafetta's Italian form 'Mazaua' or 'Mazzaua'." Schumacher failed however to discern the hand of Andrés de San Martín. More to the point, he did not detect the negation of Herrera in the two neologisms "Dimasaua" and "Limasaua." De Jesus's paper is the only work on the subject that mentions Antonio de Herrera y Tordesillas and probes his significance. References are found on pages 20, 27 and 78 of the paper as revised and published on the site of Italian nuclear scientist Dr. Vasco Caini at http://www.xeniaeditrice.it. The validity of this analysis however has yet to sink in among historians and historiographers.

This analysis has been ignored and disregarded by the National Historical Institute, a government agency of the Philippines, whose role is to help resolve historical questions. It has declared a number of times that Mazaua and Limasaua are one and the same, equating one name that signifies denial of the story of Mazaua by Herrera and the occurrence of an Easter mass. In a decision promulgated in March 1998, NHI dismissed the Ginés de Mafra account as fake, knowing fully that it is genuine. The Institute with full knowledge of its erroneous method of reaching a reconstruction of the past has transformed an honest mistake into what we might call the Limasawa hoax.

See also
Antonio de Herrera y Tordesillas
Carlo Amoretti
First mass in the Philippines
Francisco Combés
Gatighan
Ginés de Mafra
Limasawa
Rajahnate of Butuan

References
ALBO, Francisco. 1522a. Diario ó derrotero del viage de Magallanes desde el cabo de San Agustín en el Brasil, hasta el regreso a España de la nao Victoria. In: Colección de los viages y descubrimientos que hicieron  por mar los Españoles des fines de siglo XV, t. IV. Martín Fernández de Navarette (ed.). 1837. Buenos Aires 1945-46. pp. 209–47. Abbreviated CVD in citation.
—1522b. Log-Book of Francisco Alvo or Alvaro. In: The First Voyage Round The World. Lord Stanley of Alderley (ed. and trans.). Ser. I, Vol. LII, London 1874. pp. 211–236.
AYAMONTE, Martín Lopez de. 1523. A viagem de Fernão de Magalhães  por uma Presencial. In: Arquivo Histórico de Portugal, vol. I, fasc. 5, 6. Lisbon.
BERGREEN, Laurence. 2003. Over The Edge of The  World: Magellan’s Terrifying Circumnavigation of the Globe. New  York.
BERNAD, Miguel. 1981. “The Site of the First Mass on Philippine Soil: A Reexamination of the Evidence,” Kinaadman 3. Cag. de Oro: pp. 1–46.
BLAIR, Emma Helen and ROBERTSON, James Alexander. 1901-1907. The Philippine Islands 1493-1898, 55 vols. Cleveland. Abbreviated BR in citations.
BRITO, Antonio de. 1523. Carta escrita de S. João de Ternate, em 6 de Maio de 1523, a D. Manuel I. In: Alguns documentos do Arquivo Nacional da Torre do Tombo. Lisbon 1892: pp. 464–478. Also in CVD, pp. 305–11.
COLÍN, Francisco. 1663. Labor evangelica de los obreros de la Compañia de Jesús, fundación y progresos de Islas Filipinas. Pablo Pastells (ed.), 3 vols. Barcelona 1900. 1897.
COLECCIÓN de documentos inéditos relatives al descubrimiento conquista y organización de las Antiguas posesiones Españolas de ultramar. t. II. Madrid 1886. Abbreviated CDIU in citation.
COMBÉS, Francisco. 1667. Historia de las islas de Mindanao, Iolo y sus adyacentes. W.E. Retana (ed.). Madrid
DE JESUS, Vicente Calibo. (2002). Mazaua Historiography. Retrieved February 27, 2007, from MagellansPortMazaua mailing list:<http://tech.groups.yahoo.com/group/MagellansPortMazaua/files/Mazaua%20Historiography/
-- 
GENOESE PILOT. 1519. Navegaçam e vyagem que fez Fernando de Magalhães de Seuilha pera Maluco no anno de 1519 annos. In: Collecção de noticias para a historia e geografia das nações ultramarinas, que vivem nos dominios Portuguezes, ou lhes sao visinhas. Lisboa 1826. pp. 151–176.
GUILLEMARD, Francis Henry Hill. 1890. The Life of Ferdinand Magellan and the First Circumnavigation of the Globe: 1480-1521. New York.
HERRERA, Antonio de y Tordesillas. 1601. Historia general de los hechos de los Castellanos en las islas y tierrafirme del mar oceano, t. VI. Angel Gonzalez Palencia (ed.). Madrid 1947.
MAFRA, Ginés de. 1543. Libro que trata del descubrimiento y principio del Estrecho que se llama de Magallanes. Antonio Blazquez y Delgado Aguilera (eds.) Madrid 1920. pp. 179–212.
MAXIMILIANus Transylvanus. 1523. De Moluccis insulis. In: The First Voyage...Filipiniana Book Guild. Manila 1969: pp. 103–130.
MEDINA, José Toribio. 1890. El descubrimiento de Océano Pacifico: Vasco Nuñez Balboa, Hernando de Magallanes y sus compañeros. Chile, 1920.
MURILLO, Pedro Velarde. 1752. Geografia historica de las islas Philippinas...t. VIII. Madrid
PIGAFETTA, Antonio. 1524. Various editions and translations:
—1524a. Primo viaggio intorno al globo terracqueo, ossia ragguaglio della navigazione...fatta dal cavaliere Antonio Pigafetta...ora publicato per la prima volta, tratto da un codice MS. Della biblioteca Ambrosiana di Milano e corredato di note da Carlo Amoretti. Milan 1800.
—1524b. Il primo viaggio intorno al globo di Antonio Pigafetta. In: Raccolta di Documenti e Studi Publicati dalla. Commissione Colombiana. Andrea da Mosto (ed. and tr.). Rome 1894.
—1524c. Le premier tour du monde de Magellan. Léonce Peillard (ed. and transcription of Ms. fr. 5650). France 1991.
—1524d. Magellan’s Voyage, 3 vols. James Alexander Robertson (ed. and tr. of Ambrosian). Cleveland 1906.
—1524e. The First Voyage Round the World by Magellan. Lord Stanley of Alderley (ed. & tr. of Ms. fr. 5650 and Ambrosian ms.). London 1874.
—1523f. The Voyage of Magellan: The Journal of Antonio Pigafetta. Paula Spurlin Paige (tr. of Colines edition). New Jersey 1969.
—1524g. Il Primo Viaggio Intorno Al Mondo Con Il Trattato della Sfera. Facsimile edition of Ambrosian ms. Vicenza 1994.
—1524h. The First Voyage Around the World (1519–1522). Theodore J. Cachey Jr. (ed. Based on Robertson’s tr.) New York 1995.
RAMUSIO, Gian Battista. 1550. La Detta navigatione per messer Antonio Pigafetta Vicentino. In: Delle navigationi e viaggi…Venice: pp. 380–98.
REDONDO, Felipe y Sendino. 1886. Breve reseña de lo que fue y de lo que es la diócesis de Cebu. Manila.
REYES, Isabelo de los. 1889. Las islas Visayas in la epoca de la conquista. Manila.
SAN ANTONIO,  Juan Francisco de. 1744. Chronicas de la apostolica de S. Gregorio de religiosos descalzos. Manila.
SCHUMACHER, John. N. 1981. “The First Mass in the Philippines,” Kasaysayan 6, pp. 8–19.

History of the Philippines (1565–1898)
History of Southern Leyte